Carabini is a tribe of ground beetles in the subfamily Carabinae. There are 4 genera and more than 1,100 described species in Carabini.

Genera
These four genera belong to the tribe Carabini:
 Aplothorax G.R.Waterhouse, 1842 (1 species)
 Calosoma Weber, 1801  (about 164 species)
 Carabus Linnaeus, 1758 (about 959 species)
 Ceroglossus Solier, 1848 (10 species)

References 

 Zhang, X. et al. 2013: The Carabini from different altitudes of Changbaimountain, Jilin Province, north-eastern China (Coleoptera: Carabidae: Carabinae). Biodiversity journal, 4(1): 209–218.

External links 
 
 

Carabinae
Beetle tribes